Jeonju International Film Festival (JIFF, Korean: 전주국제영화제, Hanja: 全州國際映畵祭) is an Asian film festival. It was launched in 2000 as a non-competitive film festival with partial competition. It introduces independent and experimental films to focus on the alternative course of contemporary film art.

In the first edition of JIFF, debut films of Darren Aronofsky were introduced to South Korea. For the first time in Asia, Jiff highlighted early works of Béla Tarr as well. The winners of Jeonju IFF's International Competition Section include Ying Liang, John Akomfrah and Miike Takashi.

Another point of Jeonju is that it produces movies as well. Directors that once invited to Jeonju IFF, were later invited again to Jeonju Digital Project (JDP) which is a set of three digital shorts. JDP granted financial support to masters for their short films and world-premiered those pieces in Jeonju.

Celebrating its 15th edition, JDP has boosted scale up to Feature-length with GYÖRGY Pálfi (Hungary), PARK Jung bum/SHIN Yeon-shick (Republic of Korea).

One of the other characteristics of JIFF is its experimental section called Expanded Cinema (formerly called Stranger than Cinema).

History

1st Jeonju International Film Festival (2000)
Apr 28 – May 4, 2000
Number of Films: 292 films from 21 countries
Opening Film: Virgin Stripped Bare by Her Bachelors (HONG Sang-soo, Korea) 
Closing Film: M/OTHER (SUWA Nobuhiro, Japan) 
Woosuk Award (Asian Indie-Cine Forum): M/OTHER (SUWA Nobuhiro, Japan) 
Daring Digital Award (N-Vision): Riot (John AKOMFRAH, England) 
Chonju People’s Award (Cinemascape): Audition (MIIKE Takashi, Japan)

2nd Jeonju International Film Festival (2001)
Apr 27 – May 3, 2001
Number of Films: 202 films from 28 countries
Opening Film: Waikiki Brothers (YIM Soon-rye, Korea) 
Closing Film: This is My Moon (ASOKA Handagama, Sri Lanke) 
Woosuk Award (Asia Indi Forum): Mysterious Object at Noon (Apichatpong WEERASETHAKUL, Thailand) 
Daring Digital Award (N-Vision): About Pleasure and Hysteria-The Sexual Life of the Belgians, Part (Jan BUCQUOY, Belgium) 
Jeonju Korean Shorts Award (Korean Short Films): Noonday (JANG Myung-sook, Korea) 
Jeonju People’s Award (Cinemascape): Beijing Bicycle (WANG Xiao-Shuai, China, Taiwan)

3rd Jeonju International Film Festival (2002)
Apr 26 – May 2, 2002
Number of Films: 266 films from 32 countries
Woosuk Award (Asian Newcomers): Brother (YAN Yan Mak, Hong Kong, China)
Daring Digital Award (Digital Spectrum): Angel Exit (Vladimír MICHALÉK, Czech)
JIFF Favorites Award (Cinemascape): Spirited Away (MIYAZAKI Hayao, Japan)

4th Jeonju International Film Festival (2003)
Apr 25 – May 4, 2003
Number of Films: 184 films from 30 countries
Opening Film: If You Were Me (PARK Kwang-su, PARK Jin-pyo, YEO Kyung-dong, JEONG Jae-eun, PARK Chan-wook, YIM Soon-rye, Korea)
Closing Film: Far from Heaven (Todd Haynes, USA)
Woosuk Award (Asian Newcomers): Exam (Nasser REFAIE, Iran)
Daring Digital Award (Digital Spectrum): 1/2 the Rend (Marc OTTIKER, Germany)
JIFF Favorites Award (Cinemascape): Spider (David Cronenberg, Canada)

5th Jeonju International Film Festival (2004)
Apr 23 – May 2, 2004
Number of Films: 284 films from 30 countries
Opening Films: Possible Changes (MIN Byoung-kook, Korea)
Closing Films: November (Achero MAÑAS, Spain)
Woosuk Award (Indie Vision): Silence between two thoughts (Babak PAYAMI, Iran)
Special Mention (Woosuk Award): Min (HO Yu-hang, Malaysia)
Daring Digital Award (Digital Spectrum): Suite Havana (Fernando PÉREZ, Cuba)
Special Mention (Daring Digital Award): Sexual Dependency (Rodrigo BELLOTT, Bolivia, USA)
JIFF Favorites Award (Cinemascape): Coffee and Cigaret (Jim JAMUSH, USA)

6th Jeonju International Film Festival (2005)
Apr 28 – May 6, 2005
Number of Films: 176 films from 31 countries
Opening Film: Jeonju Digital Project 2005 (SONG Il-gon, Apichatpong WEERASETHAKUL, TSUKAMOTO Shinya)
Closing Film: Antarctic Journal (YIM Pil-sung, Korea)
Woosuk Award (Indie Vision): Harvest Time (Marina RAZBEZKHINA, Russia)
Special Mention (Woosuk Award): I, Claudia (Chris ABRAHAM, Canada)
JJ-Star Award (Digital Spectrum): Oxhide (LIU Jia-yin, China)
Audience Critics’ Award (Korean Cinema on the Move): The Gate of Truth (KIM Hee-chul, Korea) 
Special Mention (Audience Critics’ Award): Five is Too Many (AHN Seong-ki, Korea) 
JIFF Favorites Award (Cinemascape, Cinema Palace): The Butterfly (Philippe MUYL, France)

7th Jeonju International Film Festival (2006)
Apr 27 – May 5, 2006
Number of Films: 194 films from 42 countries
Opening Film: Offside (Jafar, PANAJI, Iran) 
Closing Film: Don’t Look Back (KIM Young-nam, Korea) 
Woosuk Award (Indie Vision): Drifting States (Denis Côté, Canada) 
Special Mention (Woosuk Award): Smiling in a War Zone – The Art of Flying to Kabul (Simone Aaberg KAERN, Denmark) 
JJ-Star Award (Digital Spectrum): Stories from the North (Urupong RAKSASAD, Thailand) 
Special mention (JJ-Star Award): White She-Camel, the (Xavier CHRISTIAENS, Belgium) 
Audience Critics’ Award (Korean Cinema on the Move): Shocking Family (Kyungsoon, Korea) 
CGV Korean Independent Feature Distribution (Korean Independent Feature Films): Between (LEE Chang-jae, Korea) 
JIFF Favorites Award (Cinemascape, Cinema Palace): Veer-Zaara (Yash CHOPRA, India)

8th Jeonju International Film Festival (2007)
Apr 26 – May 4, 2007
Number of Films: 185 films from 37 countries
Opening Film: Off Road (HAN Seung-ryong, Korea) 
Closing Film: Exiled (Johnie TO, Hong Kong) 
Woosuk Award (Indie Vision): The Other Half (YING Liang, China) 
Special Mention (Woosuk Award): Salty Air (Alessandro ANGELINI, Italy) 
JJ-Star Award (Korean Cinema on the Move): HERs (KIM Jeong-jung, Korea) 
Audience Critics’ Award (Korean Cinema on the Move): Who’s That Knocking at My Door? (YANG Hea-hoon, Korea) 
KT&G Sangsangmadang Award (Best Short Award) (Korean Short: Critics’ Week): Seongbuk Port (SHIN Min-jae, Korea) 
KT&G Sangsangmadang Award (Best Director Award) (Korean Short: Critics’ Week): Seung-a (KIM Na-young, Korea) 
KT&G Sangsangmadang Award (Special Jury Award) (Korean Short: Critics’ Week): Blood Simple (KIM Seung-hyun, Korea) 
Special Mention (KT&G Sangsangmadang Award) (Korean Short: Critics’ Week): The Ten-minute Break (LEE Seong-tae, Korea) / The Whale in the West Sea (KIM Jae-won, Korea) 
CGV Korean Independent Feature Distribution (Korean Independent Feature Films): Who’s That Knocking at My door? (YANG Hea-hoon, Korea) 
NETPAC (Network for the Promotion of Asian Cinema) (Asian Feature Films): Summer Heat (Brillante MENDOZA, The Philippines) 
JIFF Favorites Award (Cinemascape, Cinema Palace): When the Road Bends… Tales of a Gypsy Caravan (Jasmine DELLAL, USA)

9th Jeonju International Film Festival (2008)
May 1–9, 2008
Number of Films: 195 films from 40 countries
Opening Film: The Kiss (MANDA Kunitoshi, Japan) 
Closing Film: If You Were Me 4 (BANG Eun-jin, JEON Kye-soo, LEE Hyeon-seung, Kim Tae-yong, Korea) 
Woosuk Award (Grand Prize) (International Competition): The Stolen Man (Matias PIÑEIRO, Argentina) 
JJ-Star Award (Korean Cinema on the Move): Daytime Drinking (NOH Young-seok, Korea) 
Special Mention (JJ-Star Award) (Korean Cinema on the Move): My Heart Is Not Broken Yet (Ahn Hae-ryong, Japan, Korea) 
Audience Critics’ Award (Korean Cinema on the Move): Daytime Drinking (NOH Young-seok, Korea) 
KT&G Sangsangmadang Award (Best Short Award) (Korean Short: Critics’ Week): Please, Stop the Train (HAN Ji-hye, Korea) 
KT&G Sangsangmadang Award (Best Director Award) (Korean Short: Critics’ Week): Senbei Selling Girl (KIM Dong-myung, Korea) 
KT&G Sangsangmadang Award (Special Jury Award) (Korean Short: Critics’ Week): Boys (YOON Sung-hyun, Korea) 
Special Mention (KT&G Sangsangmadang Award): The Oxherding Pictures #4 “Catching the ox-Two Chinese quinces” (Lee Ji-sang, Korea) 
CGV Korean Independent Feature Distribution (Korean Independent Feature Films): Action Boys (Jung Byung-gil, Korea) 
NETPAC (Network for the Promotion of Asian Cinema) (Asian Feature Films): Children of God (YI Seung-jun, Korea) 
JIFF Favorites Award (Cinemascape, Cinema Palace): Action Boys (Jung Byung-gil, Korea)

10th Jeonju International Film Festival (2009)
Apr 30 – May 8, 2009
Number of Films: 200 films from 42 countries
Opening Film: Short! Short! Short! 2009 (KIM Sung-ho, Chegy, YANG Hea-hoon, YOON Seong-ho, LEE Song Hee-il, KIM Young-nam, KIM Eun-kyung, NAM Da-Jeung, CHOE Equan, KWON Jong-kwan, Korea) 
Closing Film: Macahn (Uberto PASOLINI, UK) 
Woosuk Award (Grand Prize) (International Competition): Imburnal (Sherad Anthony SANCHEZ, The Philippines) 
DAUM Special Jury Prize (International Competition): Inland (Tariq TEQUIA, Algeria, France) 
JJ-Star Award (Korean Feature Films Competition): Missing Person (LEE Seo, Korea) 
Special Mention (JJ-Star Award) (Korean Feature Films Competition): Where is Ronny… (SIM Sang-kook, Korea) 
Audience Critics’ Award (Korean Feature Films Competition): Bandhobi (Shin Dong-Il, Korea) 
Eastar Jet Award (Grand Prize) (Korean Short Films Competition): Don’t Step Out of the House (JO Sung-hee, Korea) 
KT&G Sangsangmadang Award (Best Director Award) (Korean Short Films Competition): The Death of a Newspaperman (KIM Eun-kyung, Korea) 
KT&G Sangsangmadang Award (Special Jury Award) (Korean Short Films Competition): The Strange Voyage (KIM Bo-ra, Korea) 
CGV Korean Independent Feature Distribution (Korean Independent Feature Films): Bandhobi (Shin Dong-Il, Korea) 
NETPAC (Network for the Promotion of Asian Cinema) (Asian Feature Films): Imburnal (Sherad Anthony SANCHEZ, The Philippines) 
JIFF Favorites Award (Cinemascape, Cinema Palace): School Days with a Pig (MAEDA Tetsu, JAPAN)

11th Jeonju International Film Festival (2010)
Apr 29 – May 7, 2010
Number of Films: 208 films from 48 countries
Opening Film: Should’ve kissed (PARK Jin-oh, Korea) 
Closing Film: To the Sea (Pedro González-RUBIO, Mexico) 
Woosuk Award (Grand Prize) (International Competition): Susa (Rusudan PIRVELI, Georgia) 
JB Bank Award (Special Jury Prize) (International Competition): Red Dragonflies (LIAO Jiekai, Singapore) 
JJ-Star Award (Korean Feature Films Competition): Passerby #3 (SHIN Su-won, Korea) 
Audience Critics’ Award (Korean Feature Films Competition): The Boy from Ipanema (Kim Kih-hoon, Korea) 
Eastar Jet Award (Grand Prize) (Korean Short Films Competition): Frozen Land (KIM Tae-yong, Korea) 
Best Director Award (Korean Short Films Competition): Hard-boiled Jesus (JUNG Young-heon, Korea) 
Special Jury Award (Korean Short Films Competition): A Brand New Journey (KIM Hee-jin, Korea) 
CGV Movie Collage Award (Korean Independent Feature Films): The Boy from Ipanema (Kim Kih-hoon, Korea) 
NETPAC (Network for the Promotion of Asian Cinema) (Asian Feature Films): Clash (Pepe DIOKNO, The Philippines) 
JIFF Audience Award (Cinemascape, Cinema Palace): Before the Full Moon (SEO She-chin, Korea)

12th Jeonju International Film Festival (2011)
Apr 28 – May 6, 2011
Number of Films: 190 films from 38 countries
Opening Film: Nadar and Simin, A Separation (Asghar FARHADI, Iran) 
Closing Film: Anyang, Paradise City (PARK Chan-kyong, Korea) 
Woosuk Award (Grand Prize) (International Competition): Jean Gentil (Laura Amelia GUZMAN, Dominican Republic, Mexico, Germany) 
JB Bank Award (Special Jury Prize) (International Competition): The Dream of Eleuteria (Remton Siega ZUASOLA, The Philippines) 
JIFF Audience Award (International Competition): An Escalator in World Order (KIM Kyung-man, Korea) 
JJ-Star Award (Grand Prize) (Korean Feature Films Competition): Anyang, Paradise City (PARK Chang-kyong, Korea) 
Audience Critics’ Award (Korean Feature Films Competition): The Color of Pain (LEE Kang-hyun, Kore) 
JIFF Audience Award (Korean Feature Films Competition): The True-taste Show (KIM Jae-hwan, Korea) 
ZIP& Award (Grand Prize) (Korean Short Films Competition): Double Clutch (Ahn Gooc-jin, Korea) 
Best Director Award (Korean Short Films Competition): Confession (YU Ji-young, Korea) 
Special Jury Award (Korean Short Films Competition): Rough Education (JOE Seung-yeon, Korea) 
Movie Collage Award (Korean Independent Films): Pong Ddol (O Muel, Korea) 
Eastar Jet & NETPAC Award (Asian Feature Films): Single Man (HAO Jie, China)

13th Jeonju International Film Festival (2012)
Apr 26 – May 4, 2012
Number of Films: 184 films from 42 countries
Opening Film: Sister (Ursula MEIER, France) 
Closing Film: A Simple Life (Ann Hui, Hong Kong) 
Woosuk Award (Grand Prize) (International Competition): Summer of Giacomo (Alessandro COMODIN, Italy, France, Belgium) 
JB Bank Award (Special Jury Prize) (International Competition): Ex Press (Jet B. LEYCO, The Philippines) 
JIFF Audience Award (International Competition): The River Used to Be a Man (Jan ZABEIL, Germany) 
JJ-Star Award (Grand Prize) (Korean Film Competition): Sleepless Night (Jang Kun-jae, Korea) 
Audience Critics’ Award (Korean Film Competition): Without Father (KIM Eung-su, Korea) 
JIFF Audience Award (Korean Film Competition): Sleepless Night (Jang Kun-jae, Korea) 
ZIP& Award (Grand Prize) (Korean Short Film Competition): Noodle Fish (KIM Jin-man, Korea) 
Best Film Award (Korean Short Film Competition): The Arrival (SIN Yiee-soo, Korea) / Why Does Wind Blow (LEE Hang-jun, Korea) 
CGV Movie Collage Award (Korean Independent Feature Films): PADAK (LEE Dae hee, Korea) 
Netpac- Eastar Jet Award (Asian Feature Films): Florentina Hubaldo, CTE (Lav DIAZ, The Philippines)

14th Jeonju International Film Festival (2013)
Apr 25 – May 3, 2013
Number of Films: 190 films from 46 countries
Opening Film: Foxfire (Laurent CANTET, France) 
Closing Film: Wadjda (Haifaa AL MANSOUR, Saudi Arabia) 
Grand Prize (International Film Competition): LOST PARADISE (Eve DEBOISE, France) 
Best Picture Prize (International Film Competition): (TIE) REMAGES (OZAWA Masato, Japan) and MAMAY UMENG (BALTAZAR, Dwein, Philippines)
Special Jury Prize (International Film Competition): PRACTICAL GUIDE TO BELGRADE WITH SINGING AND CRYING (Bojan VULETIĆ, Serbia) 
Grand Prize (Korean Film Competition): DECEMBER (PARK Jeong-hoon, Korea)
Audience Critics Prize (Korean Film Competition): MY PLACE (PARK Moon-chil, Korea) 
CGV Movie COLLAGE Prize (Korean Film Competition): Dear Dolphin (Kang Jin-a, Korea) / LEBANON EMOTION (JUNG Young-heon, Korea) 
Grand Prize (Korean Short Film Competition): SWEET TEMPTATION (JEONG Han-jin, Korea) 
Best Director Prize (Korean Short Film Competition): MASK AND MIRROR (MIN Byung-hun, Korea, France) 
Special Jury Prize (Korean Short Film Competition): TWO GENTLEMEN (PARK Jae-ok, Korea) 
NETPAC Prize (Asian Feature Film): FLASHBACK MEMORIES 3D (MATSUE Tetsuaki, Japan)

15th Jeonju International Film Festival (2014)
May 1–10, 2014
Number of Films: 181 films from 44 countries
Opening Film: MAD SAD BAD (Ryoo Seung-wan, HAN Jiseung, KIM Taeyong, Korea) 
Grand Prize (International Competition): History Of Fear (Benjamin NAISHTAT, Argentina, France, Germany, Uruguay, Qatar) 
Best Picture Award (International Competition): Coast Of Death (Lois Patiño, Spain) 
Special Jury Award (International Competition): Hotel Nueva Isla (Irene GUTIÉRREZ, Javier LABRADOR, Cuba, Spain) 
Grand Prize (Korean Competition): A Fresh Start (JANG Woojin, Korea)
CGV MovieCOLLAGE Award: Upcoming Project Support (Korean Competition): The Wicked (YOO Youngseon, Korea) 
CGV MovieCOLLAGE Award: Distribution Support (Korean Competition): One For All, All For One (PARK Sayu, PARK Donsa, Korea, Japan)
Grand Prize (Korean Competition For Shorts): How Long Has That Door Been Open? (KIM Yuri, Korea) 
Best Director Award (Korean Competition For Shorts): 12th Assistant Deacon (Jang Jae-hyun, Korea) 
Special Jury Award (Korean Competition For Shorts): HOSANNA (NA Youngkil, Korea) 
NETPAC Award (Non-Competition Sections): Tokyo Family (YAMADA Yoji, Japan)

16th Jeonju International Film Festival (2015)
April 30 – May 9, 2015
Opening Film: Partisan (Ariel Kleiman, Australia) 
Grand Prize (International Competition): Poet on a Business Trip (Ju Anqi, China) 
Best Picture Award (International Competition): Navajazo (Ricardo SILVA, Mexico) 
Special Jury Award (International Competition): Parabellum (Lukas VALENTA RINNER, Argentina/Austria/Uruguay) 
Special Mention Award (International Competition): Until I Lose My Breath (Leading Actress Esme MADRA, Turkey/Germany)
Grand Prize (Korean Competition): Alice in Earnestland (Ahn Gooc-jin, Korea)
CGV Arthouse Award: Distribution Support (Korean Competition): With or Without You (PARK Hyuckjee, Korea)
CGV Arthouse Award: Upcoming Project Support (Korean Competition): To be Sixteen (KIM Hyeonseung, Korea)
Special Mention Award (Korean Competition): Stay with Me (RHEE Jinwoo, Korea)
Grand Prize (Korean Competition For Shorts): Blossom (HAN Inmi, Korea) 
Best Director Award (Korean Competition For Shorts): A Crevice of Violence (LIM Cheol, Korea) 
Special Jury Award (Korean Competition For Shorts): A Lonely Bird (SEOJUNG Sinwoo, Korea) 
NETPAC Award (Non-Competition Sections): Under the Sun (AHN Seulki, Korea)

17th Jeonju International Film Festival (2016)
April 28 – May 7, 2016
Number of Films: 211 films from 45 countries
Opening Film: Born to Be Blue (Robert Budreau, Canada) 
Grand Prize (International Competition): Sand Storm (Elite ZEXER, Israel)
Best Picture Award (International Competition) (sponsored by Woosuk University): Short Stay (Tedd FENDT, USA)
Special Jury Award (International Competition): The Wounded Angel (Emir BAIGAZIN; Kazakhstan, France, Germany) 
Special Mention Award (International Competition): Dead Slow Ahead (Mauro HERCE, Spain, France)
Grand Prize (Korean Competition) (sponsored by Paekche Institute of the Arts): Our Love Story (LEE Hyunju, Korea) / Delta Boys (KO Bongsoo, Korea)
CGV Arthouse Award: Distribution Support (Korean Competition): Breathing Underwater (KOH Heeyoung, Korea)
CGV Arthouse Award: Upcoming Project Support (Korean Competition): Delta Boys (KO Bongsoo, Korea)
Special Mention Award (Korean Competition): Breathing Underwater (KOH Heeyoung, Korea)
Grand Prize (Korean Competition For Shorts) (sponsored by Kyobo Life Insurance Company): Summer Night (LEE Jiwon, Korea) 
Best Director Award (Korean Competition For Shorts) (sponsored by DACC CARBON): Cyclical Night (PAIK Jongkwan, Korea) 
Special Jury Award (Korean Competition For Shorts) (sponsored by DACC CARBON): Deer Flower (KIM Kangmin, Korea) 
NETPAC Award (Non-Competition Sections): Spy Nation (CHOI Seungho, Korea)
Documentary Award (sponsored by Jin Motors): Spy Nation (CHOI Seungho, Korea)

18th Jeonju International Film Festival (2017)
April 27 – May 6, 2017
Number of Films: 229 films from 58 countries
Opening Film: On Body and Soul (Ildikó Enyedi; Hungary)
Closing Film: Survival Family (Shinobu Yaguchi; Japan)
Grand Prize (International Competition): Rifle (Davi Pretto; Brazil)
Woosuk Award (International Competition): The Park (Damien MANIVEL; France)
Special Jury Prize (International Competition): In Between (Maysaloun Hamoud; Israel, France) / The Human Surge (Eduardo Williams; Argentina, Brazil, Portugal)
Grand Prize (Korean Competition): The Seeds of Violence (IM Taegyu; Korea)
CGV Arthouse Award: Distribution Support Prize (Korean Competition): The Seeds of Violence (IM Taegyu; Korea)
CGV Arthouse Award: Upcoming Project Support Prize (Korean Competition): Happy Bus Day (LEE Seungwon; Korea)
Grand Prize (Korean Competition For Shorts): Alone Together (BAE Gyung-heon; Korea) 
Best Director Prize (Korean Competition For Shorts): Hye-Young (KIM Youngsam; Korea) 
Special Jury Prize (Korean Competition For Shorts): Bomdong (CHAE Euiseok; Korea) 
NETPAC Award: The Painter's View (KIM Heecheol; Korea)
Documentary Award: Blue Butterfly Effect (PARK Moonchil, Korea)
Daemyung Culture Wave Award: Loser’s Adventure (KO Bongsu, Korea)
Union Investment Partners Award (Best Directorial Debut): Saem (HWANG Gyuil, Korea)

19th Jeonju International Film Festival (2018)
May 3–12, 2019
Number of Films: 246 films
Opening Film: Yakiniku Dragon (Jeong Ui-sin/Wishing CHONG; Japan) 
Closing Film: Isle of Dogs (Wes Anderson; USA, Germany)
Grand Prize (International Competition): The Heiresses (Marcelo Martinessi; Paraguay)
Best Picture Award (International Competition): Distant Constellation (Shevaun Mizrahi; USA, Turkey, Netherlands)
Special Jury Award (International Competition): The Return (Malene Choi Jensen; Denmark, Korea)
Grand Prize (Korean Competition): The Land of Seonghye (Jung Hyungsuk; Korea)
CGV Arthouse Award: Distribution Support Prize (Korean Competition): Dreamer (Cho Sungbin; Korea)
CGV Arthouse Award: Upcoming Project Support Prize (Korean Competition): Back From the Beat (Choi Changhwan; Korea)
Grand Prize (Korean Competition For Shorts): Dong-a (Kwon Yeji; Korea) 
Best Director Prize (Korean Competition For Shorts): Refund (Song Yejin; Korea) 
Special Jury Prize (Korean Competition For Shorts): Apocalypse Runner (Cho Hyunmin; Korea) 
NETPAC Award (Non-Competition Sections): Adulthood (Kim Inseon; Korea)
Documentary Award (sponsored by Jin Motors): Land of Sorrow (Lee Johoon, Korea)
Union Award: Graduation (Hui Jiye, Korea)

20th Jeonju International Film Festival (2019)
May 2–11, 2019
Number of Films: 275 films from 53 countries
Opening Film: Piranhas (Claudio Giovannesi; Italy)
Closing Film: Skin (Guy Nattiv; United States)
Grand Prize (International Competition): From Tomorrow On, I will (Ivan Markovic, Wu Linfeng; China, Germany, Serbia)
Best Picture Award (International Competition): Homing (Helvecio Marins Jr.; Brazil, Germany)
Special Jury Award (International Competition): Last Night I Saw You Smiling (Kavich Neang; Cambodia, France)
Grand Prize (Korean Competition) (sponsored by NH NongHyup): Scattered Night (Kim Sol, Lee Jihyoung; Korea)
Best Acting Prize (Korean Competition): Kwak Mingyu for Wave (Choi Changhwan; Korea) / Moon Seung-a for Scattered Night (Kim Sol, Lee Jihyoung; Korea)
Jury Special Mention (Korean Competition): Wave (Choi Changhwan; Korea)
CGV Arthouse Award: Distribution Support Prize (Korean Competition): The Sea of Itami Jun (Jung Dawoon; Korea)
CGV Arthouse Award: Upcoming Project Support Prize (Korean Competition): Move the Grave (Jeong Seung-o; Korea)
Grand Prize (KAFA Award) (Korean Competition For Shorts): Parterre (Lee Sangwhan; Korea) 
Best Director Prize (Korean Competition For Shorts) (sponsored by Kyobo Life Insurance Company): Leo (Lee Deok-chan; Korea) 
Special Jury Prize (Korean Competition For Shorts): Sick (Lee Woodong; Korea) 
NETPAC Award (Non-Competition Sections): The Harvest (Misho Antadze; Korea)
Documentary Award (sponsored by Jin Motors): Rivercide: The Secret six (Kim Byeongki, Korea)

21st Jeonju International Film Festival (2020)
May 28 – June 6, 2020
Number of Films: 180 films from 38 countries
Awardees:
International Competition
Grand Prize: Damp Season (GAO Ming)
 Best Picture Prize (Sponsored by NH NongHyup): One in a Thousand (Clarisa NAVAS)
Special Jury Prize: The Year of the Discovery (Luis López CARRASCO)
Special Mention: Two actors of Adam (Maryam TOUZANI), Lubna AZABAL as Abla, Nisrin ERRADI as Samia
Korean Competition
Grand Prize (wavve Award): Gull (KIM Mijo), Mom’s Song (SHIN Dongmin)
Best Acting Prize: Black Light (BAE Jongdae) Yeom Hye-ran, Dispatch; I Don’t Fire Myself (LEE Taegyeom) OH Jungse
CGV Arthouse Award: Homeless (LIM Seunghyeun)
Korean Competition for Shorts
Grand Prize (wavve Award): The End of the Universe (HAN Byunga)
 Best Director Prize (Sponsored by Kyobo Life Insurance): Walking Backwards (BANG Sungjun)
Special Jury Prize: Each (KANG Jeongin), Expiration Date (YOO Joonmin)
Special Mention: The Thread (CHO Minjae, LEE Nayeon)
 NETPAC Award: The Shepherdess and the Seven Songs (Pushpendra SINGH)
 Documentary Award (Sponsored by Jin Motors): Comfort (Emmanuel Moonchil PARK)

22nd Jeonju International Film Festival (2021)
April 29 – May 8, 2021
Number of Films: 194 films from 48 countries 
Opening Film: Father (Srdan Golubović; Serbia)
Closing Film: Josep (Aurel; France, Belgium and Spain)
Awardees:
International Competition Grand Prize: Splinters (Natalia GARAYALDE)
Best Picture Prize (Sponsored by NH Nonghyup): Landscapes of Resistance (Marta POPIVODA)
Special Jury Prize: Friends and Strangers (James VAUGHAN)
Korean Competition Grand Prize Kim Min-young of the Report Card (LEE Jae-eun, LIM Jisun)
Best Actor Prize: Aloners (HONG Sung-eun), GONG Seung-yeon Not Out (LEE Jung-gon) JEONG Jaekwang
CGV Arthouse Award Upcoming Project Prize: Not Out (LEE Jung-gon)
CGV Arthouse Award Distribution Support Prize: Aloners (HONG Sung-eun)
Watcha´s Pick: Feature Not Out (LEE Jung-gon)
Special Mention: Coming to you (BYUN Gyuri)
Korean Competition for Shorts Grand Prize: Vacation Event (CHOI Minyoung)
Best Director Prize (Sponsored by Kyobo Life Insurance): Without You (PARK Jaehyun)
Special Jury Prize: Wasteland (LEE Tack), A blue giant (NOH Gyeongmu)
Watcha´s Pick: Short Wasteland (LEE Tack), Weed Fiction (CHO Eungil), Maria&Beyonce (SONG Yechan), Training Session (KIM Changbum), Vacation Event (CHOI Minyoung)
Special Award: Documentary Award (Sponsored by Jin Motors): Coming to you (BYUN Gyuri)
J Vision Award: Teacher´s Day (LEE Jihyang), Out of Season (HUH Gun)
NETPAC Award: JAZZ KISSA BASIE (HOSHINO Tetsuya)

23rd Jeonju International Film Festival (2022)
April 28 – May 7, 2022
 Number of Films: 217 films from 52 countries
 Jury: 14 judges in the competition section and NETPAC Awards, consisting of multinational directors, actors and programmers.
Opening Film: After Yang by Kogonada (United States, 2021)
Closing Film: Full Time (Éric Gravel; France 2021)
MCs: Jang Hyun-sung and Yoo In-na
Awardees:
International Competition Grand Prize: Geographies of Solitude (Jacquelyn Mills)
Best Picture Prize (Sponsored by NH Nonghyup): Unrest (Cyril Schäublin)
Special Jury Prize: Tokyo Kurds (Fumiari Hyuga) and The Silence of the Mole (Anaïs Taracena)
Korean Competition Grand Prize: Jeong-sun (Jeong Ji-hye)
Korean Competition for Shorts Special Jury Prize: Wunderkammer 10.0 (Yelim Ki, Soyun Park, Inwoo Jung)
Best Actor Prize (Sponsored by ONFIFN): Missing Yoon (Kim Jinhwa) OH Mine and Archaeology of love (Lee Wanmin) OK Ja-yeon
CGV Arthouse Award Upcoming Project Prize: The Hill of Secrets (Lee Ji-eun)
CGV Arthouse Award Distribution Support Prize: Mother and Daughter (Kim Jung-eun)
Watcha´s Pick: Feature: Mother and Daughter (Kim Jung-eun)
Special Mention: Archaeology of love (Lee Wanmin)

24th Jeonju International Film Festival (2023)
April 27 – May 6, 2023

Jeonju Digital Project and Jeonju Cinema Project
From 2000 to 2013, JIFF's Jeonju Digital Project (JDP) bestowed KW50m each year to three directors to fund their short films. In 2014, JDP increased its total budget to KW180m to produce three feature films. In 2015, JDP was renamed to Jeonju Cinema Project (JCP), and the budget was further increased to KW300m.

Jeonju Digital Project 2000
The Jeonju International Film Festival presents Short Digital Films by Three Filmmakers (PARK Kwang-Su, ZHANG Yuan, and KIM Yun-Tae) in conversation with each other about their various interpretations of the digital film medium.

The filmmakers were given three conditions: to make a film in digital format, no longer than 30 minutes, and using a limited production budget. The three films construct one feature-length film entitled N, representing Next Generation, New Technology and Networking which are the common themes. Projects like Short Digital Films by Three Filmmakers, which focus on film production, creativity, and interactive technology, reflect the spirit of JIFF as they explore the zeitgeist of contemporary film. 
Film List
www.whitelover.com (PARK Kwang-Su, Korea)
Dal Segno (KIM Yun-Tae, Korea)
Jin Xing Files (ZHANG Yuan, Korea)

Jeonju Digital Project 2001
JIFF attempts to open up new aesthetics for digital films as well as their functional efficiency. AKOMFRAH of England, JIA Zhang Ke of China, and TSAI Ming Liang of Taiwan, who have experimented in the genre of digital films, will show their works, these will be added to the list of digital masterpieces.
Film List
In Public (JIA Zhang-ke, China)
Digitopia (John AKOMFRAH, UK)
Conversation with God, a (TSAI Ming Lia, Taiwan)

Jeonju Digital Project 2002
Jeonju International Film Festival 2002 has selected 3 cineastes in Asia. The three men are: director MOON Seung-Wook from Korea, who gained international critical acclaim last year with his film (Nabi-Butterfly), director WANG Xiao-shuai from China, whose film (Beijing Bicycle) was shown in last year's festivals, and who has, through his many films, become the representative artist of the Chinese 6th generation filmmakers, and lastly, SUWA Nobuhiro from Japan, who has already achieved the status of maestro of the 21st century films in Japan.
Film List
Survival Game (MOON Seung-wook, Korea)
The New Year (WANG Xiao-shuai, Korea)
A Letter From Hiroshima (SUWA Nobuhiro, Korea)

Jeonju Digital Project 2003
Like previous years, JIFF presents ‘Digital Short Films by Three Filmmakers’, where three directors are invited to come together at Jeonju. This year's participants are young directors, AOYAMA Shinji, Bahman GHOBADI, PARK Ki-Yong. Japan's director AOYAMA Shinji has received worldwide acclaim by establishing his own cinematic traits beginning with his debut film. Iranian director Bahman GHOBADI has made his entrance into the arena of world directors with his film The Hours of the Drunken Horses (Zamani Baraye Masti Asbha). The Korean director, PARK Ki-yong, has opened new possibilities in digital films through Camel(s).
Film List
Daf (Bahman GHOBADI, Korea)
Digital Search (PARK Ki-Yong, Korea)
Like a Desperado Under the Eaves (AOYAMA Shinji, Korea)

Jeonju Digital Project 2004
Film List
Mirrored Mind (ISHII Sogo, Korea)
Dance me to the End of Love (YU Lik-Wai, Korea)
Influenze (BONG Joon-ho, Korea)

Jeonju Digital Project 2005
Film List
Magician(s) (Song Il-gon, Korea)
Worldly Desires (Apichatpong Weerasethakul, Korea)
Haze (Shinya Tsukamoto, Korea)

Jeonju Digital Project 2006
Instead of selecting directors from Korea, Japan, and China this year's “Digital Short Films by Three Filmmakers" section broadens its scope to other regions of Asia. The directors participating this year are as follows: Darezhan OMIRBAYEV, from Kazakhstan, who won the Un Certain Regard award at the 1998 Cannes Film Festival for his film Killer; Eric KHOO, from Singapore, who is starting to garner international attention after his film Be With Me was chosen as the opening film for Director's Fortnight at the Cannes Film Festival; and Pen-ek RATANARUANG, from Thailand, whose film Invisible Waves starring Korean actress KANG Hye-jung and Japanese actor Tadanobu ASANO was selected for competition at the 2006 Berlin Festival. The interlude segments will connect the three stories together and is directed by Chegy, the director of Fade into You.
Film List
Twelve Twenty (Pen-ek RATANARUANG, Thailand)
About Love (Darezhan OMIRBAYEV, Korea)
No Day Off (Eric KHOO, Korea)

Jeonju Digital Project 2007
Previously focused on Asian directors, Jeonju Digital Project 2007 takes a look at Europe. The Portuguese filmmaker Pedro COSTA, the German filmmaker Harun FAROCKI, and the French filmmaker Eugène GREEN participated in this project.
Film List
Respite (Harun FAROCKI, Korea)
The Rabbit Hunters (Pedro COSTA, Korea)
Correspondences (Eugène GREEN, Korea)

Jeonju Digital Project 2008
The participated three directors this year are Idrissa OUEDRAOGO from Burkina Faso, built his fame on (1990), the African rising star director, Mahamat Saleh-HAROUN from Chad whom was introduced at Jeonju International Film Festival with his noticeable film, after winning Grand Special Jury Prize at Venice International Film Festival 2006, and Nacer KHEMIR from Tunisia continuing to build his own unique artistic world of cohesive subject matters as in his film which won Special Jury Prize at Locarno International Film Festival.
Film List
the Alphabet of My Mother (Nacer KHEMIR, Korea, France)
the Birthday (Idrissa OUEDRAOGO, Korea)
Expectations (Mahamat Saleh-HAROUN, Korea, France)

Jeonju Digital Project 2009
Film List
Butterflies Have No Memories (Lav DIAZ, Korea)
Koma (KAWASE Naomi, Korea)
Lost in the Mountains (Hong Sang-soo, Korea)

Jeonju Digital Project 2010
This digital filmmaking project began with the start of JIFF in 2000 and now became a key project of JIFF; JIFF bestows 50 million KRW, for production of a digital film over 30 minutes to each director. In 2010, James BENNING, a master of US experimental/independent films, Canadian independent filmmaker Denis CÔTÉ, and Argentina's rising star Matías PIÑEIRO have participated in the project.
Film List
Rosalind (Matías PIÑEIRO, Korea)
Pig Iron (James BENNING, Korea)
The Enemy Lines (Denis CÔTÉ, Korea)

Jeonju Digital Project 2011
JIFF plans and releases Jeonju Digital Project every year to support creative artists who explore film aesthetics and its future. Since its inception, JIFF has given much thought to the possibility of digital films. Jeonju Digital Project has been screened in Venice, Toronto, Locarno, Torino, Vancouver, Vienna, Hong Kong, Argentina, etc. During the 2006 Locarno Film Festival, a special exhibition was held under the title of ―Digital Asia where all of the Jeonju Digital Project works were presented, and in 2007, one of the project's productions (Pedro COSTA, Eugène GREEN, Harun FAROCKI) won the Special Jury Prize at the Locarno Film Festival International Competition section. And by Mahamat-Saleh HAROUN, one of the Jeonju Digital Projects in 2008, also received Special Jury Award in Africa-Asia Short Film Competition at Dubai International Film Festival.
Film List
To The Devil (Clair DENIS, Korea)
Memories of a Morning (José Luis GUERĺN, Korea)
An Heir (Jean-Marie STRAUB, Korea)

Jeonju Digital Project 2012
Film List
The Great Cinema Party (Raya MARTIN, Korea)
Light in the Yellow Breathing Space (Vimukthi JAYASUNDARA, Korea)
When Night Falls (YING Liang, Korea)

Jeonju Digital Project 2013
Film List
Someone's Wife in the Boat of Someone's Husband (Edwin; Korea, Indonesia)
Strangers When We Meet (Masahiro Kobayashi; Korea, Japan)
Over There (Zhang Lu; Korea)

Jeonju Digital Project 2014
Film List
Free Fall (György PÁLFI, Korea, Hungary)
The Avian Kind (Shin Yeon-shick, Korea)
Alive (Park Jung-bum, Korea)

Jeonju Cinema Project 2015
Film List
El Movimiento (Benjamín NAISHTAT; Argentina, Korea)
Snow Paths (KIM Heejung; Korea)
Samnye (LEE Hyun-jung; Korea)

Jeonju Cinema Project 2016
Film List
A Decent Woman (Lukas Valenta RINNER; Argentina, South Korea, Austria)
Great Patrioteers (KIM Soo-hyun; South Korea)
A Stray Goat (CHO Jae-min; South Korea)

Jeonju Cinema Project 2017
Film List
Our President (LEE Chang-jae; South Korea)
The First Lap (KIM Dae-hwan; South Korea)
The Poet and the Boy (KIM Yang-hee; Korea)

Jeonju Cinema Project 2018
Film List
The Play (Alejandro Fernández Almendras; Chile, Czech Republic, France, South Korea)
Nona. If They Soak Me, I’ll Burn Them (Camila José DONOSO; Chile, Brazil, France, South Korea)
A Good Business (LEE Hark Joon; Korea)
The Winter Night (JANG Woo-jin; Korea)
The Land on the Waves (LIM Taegue; Korea)

Jeonju Cinema Project 2019
Film List
Somewhere in Between (JEON Jeehee; South Korea)
the Breathing of the fire (KO Hee-young; South Korea)
Isadora's Children (Damien MANIVEL; France, South Korea)
Shades of the Heart (Kim Jong-kwan; South Korea)

See also
List of festivals in South Korea
List of festivals in Asia

References

External links

 Jeonju International Film Festival Official Website
 Jeonju International Film Festival History Overview
 Jeonju Digital Project History Overview

Annual events in South Korea
Film festivals in South Korea
Tourist attractions in North Jeolla Province
Jeonju
Spring (season) events in South Korea